The Ramapough Mountain Indians (also spelled Ramapo) are a state-recognized tribe in New Jersey. They were previously known as the Ramapough Lenape Nation or Ramapough Lunaape Munsee Delaware Nation and may be known as the Ramapough Lenape Nation.

They have approximately 5,000 members who primarily live around the Ramapo Mountains of Bergen and Passaic counties in northern New Jersey and Rockland County in southern New York, about 25 miles (40 km) from New York City.

They are not a federally recognized Native American tribe, but they are state-recognized by New Jersey. Their tribal office is located on Stag Hill Road on Houvenkopf Mountain in Mahwah, New Jersey.

Since January 2007, the chief of the Ramapough Lenape Nation is Dwaine Perry.

The Ramapough Lenape Indian Nation claims descent from the Lenape, or Delaware people, although the Bureau of Indian Affairs did not find evidence of Lenape ancestry. A decision subsequently upheld upon appeal.

Petition for federal recognition 
The Ramapough Mountain Indians (RMI) filed a letter of intent to petition for the Bureau of Indian Affairs (BIA) for federal recognition as a Native American tribe in 1979. Approved on January 16, 1996, the BIA shared its final determination federal acknowledgment of the Ramapough Mountain Indians.

The proposed final determination stated that Criterion 83.7(b) required:
Evidence that a substantial portion of the petitioning group inhabits a specific area or lives in a community viewed as American Indian and distinct from other populations in the area and that its members are descendants of an Indian tribe which historically inhabited a specific area (43 F.R. 172, 39363).

The Proposed Finding concluded that the RMI did not meet this criterion at any point in time, for although there was substantial evidence that a distinct community had existed for a portion of the petitioner's history, from approximately 1870 until approximately 1950, this community had neither been "viewed as American Indian" nor were its members "descendants of an Indian tribe which historically inhabited a specific area."

The proposed finding went on to say:
Historians, anthropologists, and journalists have mentioned many tribes as possible precursors of the RMI: Munsee, Minisink, Tuscarora, Creek, Lenape (generally), Hackensack, and Delaware. However, none of the documentation submitted by the petitioner or any other documents reviewed for the proposed finding connected the earliest documented RMI ancestors with any of the tribes that once resided in New York or New Jersey.

After the RMI appealed the proposed finding, the BIA issued a reconsidered final determination that took effect January 7, 1998: "Assistant Secretary–Indian Affairs Ada E. Deer signed a reconsidered final determination which affirms the decision of January 16, 1996, to decline to acknowledge that the Ramapough Mountain Indians, Inc. (RMI)."

State-recognition 
The State of New Jersey recognizes the Ramapough Lenape Nation. The State of New York does not recognize the Ramapough Lenape Nation.

The Ramapough and two other tribes were recognized as Indian tribes in 1980 by the state of New Jersey by Resolution 3031. The New Jersey citation read: 
Be it resolved by the General Assembly of the State of New Jersey (the Senate concurring): 1. That the Ramapough Mountain People of the Ramapough Mountains of Bergen and Passaic counties, descendants of the Iroquois and Algonquin nations, are hereby designated by the State of New Jersey as the Ramapough Indians.

The tribe approached its New Jersey Assembly member, W. Cary Edwards, to seek state recognition. After several months of research, Edwards and Assemblyman Kern introduced Assembly Concurrent Resolution No. 3031 (ACR3031) on May 21, 1979. It passed the Assembly and was passed by the Senate on January 7, 1980.
	 
Edwards later said that debate in the assembly related to the Cohen book (see below); he noted that he and other supporters of recognition had to demonstrate the historical basis of the Ramapough. At the time, the state had not developed its own criteria or regulations related to tribal recognition. The state resolution also called for Federal recognition of the Ramapough, but is non-binding in that regard. The state of New Jersey has also recognized the Nanticoke Lenni-Lenape and the Powhatan Renape, descended from the Algonquian-speaking Lenape and Powhatan, respectively. Because of increased issues related to Native Americans, the State of New Jersey created the Commission on Native American Affairs by P.L.1134, c. 295, and it was signed into law on December 22, 1995, by Governor Christine Todd Whitman.

Nonprofit organization 
In 1980, the group incorporated as a 501(c)(3) nonprofit organization. Currently, its name is Ramapough Lunaape Nation, Inc. Its principal officer is Duane Perry, whose name is more commonly spelled "Dwaine." Based in Mahwah, New Jersey, its focus is "Ethnic/Immigrant Services (P84)."

Name 
The Ramapough Lenape Nation, also Ramapough Lunaape Nation, Inc., was previously called the Ramapough Mountain Indians, also spelled Ramapo. They have also used the name Ramapough Lunaape Munsee Delaware Nation.

Until the 1970s, the group was frequently referred to as the Jackson Whites, a derogatory term, which, according to legend, was either from the name of the Jackson White heirloom potato or shorthand for "Jacks and Whites", reflecting their multiracial ancestry.

In part because of the people's claimed multiracial ancestry, the outside community assumed they were descendants of runaway and freed slaves ("Jacks" in slang) and whites. Over time, the latter were believed to have included Dutch settlers (reflected in surnames common among the people) and later, Hessian soldiers, German mercenaries who had fought for the British during the American Revolution; that is, people who were considered suspect by the dominant British Americans. The people supposedly fled to frontier areas of the mountains after the end of the Revolutionary War. Thousands of escaped slaves had gone to British-occupied New York City on the promise of freedom. Some left the city for more isolated areas to escape capture after the war. There is no documentation of slaves, freed or runaway, nor of Hessian soldiers' marrying into the tribe.

The group rejects "Jacks" and "Jackson Whites" and their associated legends as pejorative labels. On July 30, 1880, The Bergen Democrat was the first newspaper to print the term Jackson Whites. A 1911 article noted it was used as a title of contempt. Instead, they called themselves "The Mountain People."

The New Jersey historian David S. Cohen, argued in his doctoral dissertation at Princeton that the old stories were legends, not history. He wrote that the legend was "the continuing vehicle for the erroneous and derogatory stereotype of the Mountain People." He claims that some of the group's ancestors were multiracial, free Afro-Dutch who had migrated from lower Manhattan to the frontier and become landowners in the Tappan Patent in the seventeenth century.

History

A number of local historians, genealogists, and archeologists have written about the Ramapough people. Accounts have evolved as archeological, historical, linguistic, and other research has advanced. As with other multiracial peoples seeking recognition as Native American tribes, the Ramapough Mountain Indians have encountered differences of opinion over the significance of ethnic ancestry in contrast to cultural and community identity in being recognized as a distinct culture.

The historian David Cohen found that early settlers in the Hackensack Valley included "free black landowners in New York City and mulattoes with some Dutch ancestry who were among the first pioneers to settle in the Hackensack River Valley of New Jersey." Among these were Augustine Van Donck, who bought land in the Tappan Patent in 1687. As the border between New York and New Jersey split the area of the patent in 1798, Cohen theorized that some of these early free people of color moved west into the mountains. (The surname Van Dunk is common among the Ramapough, as are DeGroat, DeFreese, and Mann.) Cohen thought that, while some free blacks may have married Lenape remnant peoples in the area, the residents of the mountains developed not primarily of Indian culture but as multiracial people of European-American culture, with rural traditions. The origin of these surnames could also be from earlier contact times with the Colonials. In the late 19th century, such Indians were said to use the names given by the Colonials instead of their real names because of superstition.

Edward J. Lenik, a self-taught private archaeologist, and author of 11 historical books on Eastern Woodlands Native American History, disagrees with Cohen's findings about African-European ancestry; he says, 
While the Ramapough's origins are controversial, most historians and anthropologists agree that they (Ramapough) are the descendants from local Munsee-speaking Lenape (Delaware) Indians who fled to the mountains in the late seventeenth century to escape Dutch and English settlers. It is a well known fact that displacement of Indian tribes followed European Incursions in the region which resulted in the forced movement and resettlement of Indian peoples.

Controversy over origins
The multiracial ancestry of the people in the mountains was noted by their European American neighbors. Myths, as noted in the section on their name, were derived in part from theories of origins, as well as prejudice related to unions with African descendants because slavery had developed in the colonies as a racial caste. By the mid-nineteenth century, these multi-racial mountain people were concentrated in the settlements of Mahwah and Ringwood, New Jersey; and Hillburn, New York. Local histories documented traditions of mixed-race descendants from intermarriages with the Lenape in the mountains.

In the 20th century, some anthropologists classified such isolated mixed-race groups, who tended to be historically endogamous, as tri-racial isolates or simply as mixed bloods. In 1915, Alanson Skinner of the American Museum of Natural History noted the multiracial character of the people in the Ramapo Mountains. He said that Indian descendants had mixed with Africans and Caucasians.

Cohen noted in 1974 that, as the federal censuses of 1790-1830 were missing for this area, it prevented "establishing positively the exact relationship between many of these colored families in the mountains, and the earlier colored families of the Hackensack River Valley." He noted the "tradition of Indian ancestry among the Ramapo Mountain People as early as the eighteenth century." Cohen also said, "Some Indian mixture is possible; however, Indian and colored interracial matings probably were not recorded in the Dutch Reformed Churches."

Before 1870, the State of New Jersey Census had only three racial or ethnic categories for residents: White, Black (free), and Black (slave), the same categories as were used in the slave states. Census enumerators tended to use black as the category for any people of color, including Indians. In 1870, New Jersey began recording Indians (Native Americans) as a separate category in its census; 16 were identified by census enumerators that year.

A less common theory of ancestry was that the Ramapough were Indian people who had been held as slaves by colonists.

With increasing interest and research in Native American history, a 1984 symposium was held on the Lenape. James Revey (Lone Bear), then chairman of the New Jersey Indian Office, said that "Mountain Indians" were descendants of Lenape who had retreated into the mountains of western and northeastern New Jersey and southwestern New York during the colonial era. Other scholars, such as Herbert C. Kraft, have documented that some Munsee-speaking Lenape moved into the Ramapo Mountains to escape colonial encroachment.

Kraft noted, as did Cohen (see below), that there was a gap in "the genealogical record between about 1790-1830 that prevented his assembling with exactitude individual relationships between most of the Hackensack Valley settlers and those of the Ramapo Mountains." In his own work, Kraft has not attempted to establish genealogical links between the present-day Ramapough and colonial-era Indian tribes.

According to Catalano and Planche, consultants for the tribe in its recognition process, Cohen's work has been criticized by the genealogists Alcon Pierce and Roger Joslyn. Catalano said that Cohen had no professional credentials in genealogy and that the BIA found much of his genealogical work lacking.

Edward J. Lenik, an archeologist and author of a 1999 book about the Ramapo Indians, writes:
The archaeological record indicates a strong, continuous and persistent presence of Indian bands in the northern Highlands Physiographic Providence-Ramapos well into the 18th century. Other data, such as historical accounts, record the presence of Indians in the Highlands during the 19th and 20th centuries. Oral traditions, and settlement and subsistence activities are examined as well. Native American people were a significant element among the primary progenitors of the Ramapo Mountain People ...

Historian Evan T. Pritchard, wrote 
The Ramapough, or "mountaineer Munsee", on the other hand, never disappeared. Their people still occupy the southwest portion of the point of Rockland County, on all sides of Ramapo Mountain. ... Whites have always tried, and continue to try to portray the Ramapough as foreigners: Dutch, blacks, Tuscarora, Gypsies, or Hessians. However, they are the only actual non-foreigners to be found still living in community in and around New York's metropolitan region. ... The main Ramapough Lenape villages in New York were Hillburn, Johnsontown, Furmanville, Sherwoodville, Bulsontown, Willowgrove, Sandyfields, and Ladentown. Better known, however, as Native American strongholds, are the towns just south of the border, namely Stagg Hill [Mahwah] and Ringwood.

The archeologist C.A. Weslager (1906–1994) wrote Lenape were joined by some migrating Tuscarora families fleeing South Carolina. They never continued to Iroquois country in New York, where most of the Tuscarora settled alongside the Oneida.

Governance
The Ramapough Mountain Indians have had a chief and council form of government. In 1978 they organized a nonprofit organization. That year they filed a petition with the federal Bureau of Indian Affairs of intent to gain federal recognition as a tribe. They further organized into clans for self-government: the Wolf, the Turtle and the Deer, related to their three main settlements of Mahwah and Ringwood, New Jersey; and Hillburn, New York.

The Ramapough Nation is a member of the National Congress of American Indians(NCAI), and are recognized as indigenous by them.

Recent events
In 1995, New Jersey established a Commission on American Indian Affairs (then called the Commission on Native American Affairs) with two seats each for the recognized tribes of the Ramapough Mountain Indians, the Nanticoke Lenni-Lenape, and the Powhatan Renape (the latter two groups are located in southern New Jersey.) In addition, two seats were reserved for Inter-Tribal Members, persons who belonged to other tribes but lived in New Jersey. The Commission has been placed in the Department of State.

In the spring of 2006, Emil Mann, a Ramapough Lenape man, was killed by gunshots from a New Jersey State Parks Police ranger in a confrontation with people on ATVs in Ringwood State Park. His family filed a civil suit against the state. Governor Jon Corzine's staff met with the Ramapough Lenape and other Native Americans in the state to identify problem areas and improve relations. The state undertook an investigation into the shooting, and a grand jury indicted one of the rangers.

In August 2006, Governor Jon Corzine formed the New Jersey Committee on Native American Community Affairs to investigate issues of civil rights, education, employment, fair housing, environmental protection, health care, infrastructure and equal opportunity confronting members of New Jersey's three indigenous Native American tribes and other New Jersey residents of Native American descent. The Committee's report was delivered on December 17, 2007 and cited "lingering discrimination, ignorance of state history and culture, and cynicism in the treatment of Indian people".

State and federal officials have worked with the tribes on other issues related to their people. For instance, in preparation for the 2010 census, state and federal officials consulted with the recognized tribes on means to get accurate counts of their people. The Census Bureau has created local partnerships. It recognizes State Designated Tribal Statistical Areas (SDTSA), which are established by state consultation with local tribes to identify significant areas of American Indian populations outside reservations (these had been overlooked in the twentieth century). In New Jersey, these are identified as Passaic and Bergen counties for the Ramapough Mountain Tribe, and Cumberland County for the Nanticoke Lenni-Lenape. The Rankokus Indian Reservation no longer qualifies, as the state has taken back much of the land it had earlier leased to the Powhatan Renape.

Tribal enrollment
The tribe requires members to have at least one Ramapough parent.

Environmental concerns
The tribe has experienced environmental controversies in relation to corporate efforts on or near their land:

Ford Motor Company paint contamination controversy
Members of the community have participated in litigation (Mann v. Ford) against the Ford Motor Company regarding poisoning from a former toxic waste landfill, the Ringwood Mines landfill site. Portions of this site were used in the 1970s as sites for affordable housing for the Ramapough people.

In the 1980s, the Environmental Protection Agency designated the Ringwood Mines landfill site as a Superfund site for cleanup. Ford had operated an auto assembly plant in Mahwah and its contractors dumped industrial paints and other hazardous wastes in a landfill owned by the company in an area where many Ramapough Mountain Indians live.  The EPA identified further remediation three more times as additional sludge sites were found. Following further investigation, The EPA returned the community to the Superfund list, the only site to be so treated.

In late winter 2006, some 600 Ramapough Lenape Indians, led by Wayne Mann and with the aid of Robert F. Kennedy, Jr., filed a mass tort suit (Mann v. Ford) against the "Ford Motor Company and its contractors, as well as the borough of Ringwood, for the dumping of toxic waste." They were represented by Vicki Gilliam of The Cochran Group. The suit was filed about the time of publication of Toxic Legacy, a five-part investigative series by The Record, which had found lead and antimony levels in excess of 100 times the safety limit near some Ramapough residences.

The paint sludge has been linked to contamination of food and water sources with lead and benzene. The contamination has been linked to nosebleeds, leukemia, and other ailments among the community.

The HBO documentary Mann v. Ford (2011) follows the pursuit of the lawsuit. During the 2008–2010 automotive industry crisis, at a time when it appeared that Ford might be in danger of going bankrupt, the Ramapough feared that the company might be gone and Ford acted on those fears, and in September 2009 the tribe accepted a settlement of $11 million from Ford and its contractors, plus $1.5 million from the town of Ringwood, for an average payout of $8,000 per Ramapough resident after attorney fees.

The EPA has directed the removal of an additional 47,000 tons of sludge and soil up to 2011, with cleanup continuing.

The Pilgrim Pipeline and Split Rock Sweetwater Prayer Camp
As of 2017, the tribe is fighting against the Pilgrim Pipeline. Pilgrim Pipelines Holdings, LLC plans to run a dual pipeline through the tribe's land which would carry refined products like gasoline, diesel, kerosene, aviation fuel and home heating oil north and Bakken formation crude oil south between Albany, New York and the Bayway Refinery on the Chemical Coast in Linden, New Jersey.

The line would also pass through the Ramapo Mountains and Ramapo Pass. In solidarity with Standing Rock, tribal members founded the Split Rock Sweetwater protest encampment in Mahwah, New Jersey in 2016 near the New York border to protest the Pilgrim Pipeline.

Representation in art, entertainment, and media

Film
Mann v. Ford (2011) is a documentary about the lawsuit filed by the Ramapough Lenape Indian Nation against Ford. It is regularly shown on HBO. Directed by Maro Chermayeff and Mica Fink, it features Paul Mann of the Ramapough and Vicki Gilliam of The Cochran Firm, which represented the tribe. It follows the five years of the Ramapough pursuing the suit and how they reached settlement with the company.
American Native (2013) is a documentary that details the Ramapough Lenape Nation's efforts to gain federal recognition as a Native American nation and the difficulties it has encountered due to loss of lands, racism, and loss of records.
The film Out of the Furnace (2013) is a fictional drama dealing with communities living in the Ramapough Mountains, starring Christian Bale and Zoe Saldana. Tribal leaders and town officials from Mahwah urged a boycott of the film due to negative depictions of the Ramapough Lenape Nation, which Dwaine Perry called a hate crime. Relativity Media responded that the film "is not based on any one person or group" and is "entirely fictional". Nine members of the group, eight of whom have the surname DeGroat, which is given to the film's antagonist, filed suit against the makers and other involved parties. They claimed that Out of the Furnace portrays a gang of criminals living in the Ramapo Mountains who are "lawless, drug-addicted, impoverished and violent". On May 16, 2014, U.S. District Court Judge William Walls, sitting in Newark, New Jersey, dismissed the lawsuit, saying that the film did not refer directly to any of the plaintiffs.
Akuy Eenda Maawehlaang: The Place Where People Gather (2019) is a 28-minute documentary directed by Brooklyn Demme.
The Way of the Ramapough (2022) is a 30-minute documentary based upon an interview with Turtle Clan Chief Vincent Mann in which the challenges, abuses, genocide and marginalization of the Munsee speaking Ramapough Lunnape, from first contact through contemporary times, are discussed along with how his people and the European descendants can resolve centuries of conflict and can find a mutually respectful and supportive path forward. Produced by the New Jersey Highlands Coalition, directed by Elliott Ruga.

Television
 The Red Road (2014), is a six-part HBO/SundanceTV made for television miniseries.

See also 
 Black-Dutch
 Haliwa-Saponi of North Carolina
 Melungeon
 Nanticoke of Delaware
 Person County Indians, aka "Cubans and Portuguese" of North Carolina

Sources
 Penford, Saxby Voulaer., "Romantic Suffern: The History of Suffern, New York, from the Earliest Times to the Incorporation of the Village in 1896", Tallman, NY, 1955, Chapter 6 Ramapo Mountain Folk

References

External links
Ramapough Lenape Nation, official website
Ed Lenik, Indians in the Ramapos, Survival, Persistence & Presence], North Jersey Highlands Historical Association, 1999
Strangers On The Mountain. The New Yorker Ben McGrath. 1 March 2010.
Edward J. Lenik, Ramapough Mountain Indians: People, Places and Cultural Traditions, North Jersey Highlands Historical Association, 2011
Mann v. Ford, HBO documentary about 2006 Ramapough lawsuit against Ford Motor Company
 Office of Federal Acknowledgement, Asst. Sec. Indian Affs., U.S. Dep't of the Interior, Petitioner #058: Ramapough Mountain Indians, Inc., NJ (procedural and adjudicative history).
American Native The Movie
The Upper Ringwood Collection: Featuring the Ramapough Mountain Indians, a project of the Ringwood Public Library

 
Algonquian ethnonyms
Bergen County, New Jersey
Native American tribes in New Jersey
Passaic County, New Jersey
Rockland County, New York
State-recognized tribes in the United States